"Just a Dream" is a song by American rapper and singer Nelly, released as the lead single from his sixth album 5.0 in 2010. The song was written by Mitch J, Nelly, Rico Love, Jim Jonsin and Frank Romano with Jonsin and Love producing the song. The song was released on August 16, 2010, to iTunes Stores around the world for digital download. It was released alongside the promotional single, "Tippin' In da Club". On October 6, 2010, the song was certified triple platinum by the RIAA.

Composition 

Nelly said, "I think that the way the whole song plays out, with the beat and the lyrics, I think it comes together in the sense of it's almost a timeless song."

Many have speculated "Just a Dream" is actually about Nelly's relationship with Ashanti. He responds in an interview for "That Grape Juice", "No it's not about Ashanti. It's just a song that I and my man [Rico] came up with. It's a song that just relatable on all levels – rich, poor, black, white, child, adult – whatever level it is. If [thinking it’s about Ashanti] is what helps people to go out and support it then so be it (giggles)."

The music is a sample of the track "Variations sur Marilou" by the French singer Serge Gainsbourg (1976).

Chart performance 
"Just a Dream" made its first chart appearance, debuting on the US Billboard Hot 100 at number twelve and peaking at number three in its eighth week. The song also debuted at number 38 on Billboards Mainstream Top 40 chart, and debuted at number eight on the Billboard Digital Songs chart, selling 135,000 downloads in its first week. "Just a Dream" is Nelly's highest-charting song since his 2005 single "Grillz". and debuted at number 22 on the Billboard Rap Songs chart. As of November 2013, the song has sold over 4 million copies in the United States.

The song entered the Canadian Hot 100 in August 2010, at number 32. It debuted in Australia (ARIA Charts) at number 24, on the New Zealand Singles Chart at number 29, Switzerland (Media Control AG) at number 52 and the UK Singles Chart at number 8.

Live performances 
Nelly performed "Just a Dream" during a free concert to help promote St. Louis' bid for the 2012 Democratic National Convention at Kiener Plaza on July 29, 2010. He also performed the song during the 2010 MOBO Awards in Liverpool, United Kingdom on October 20, 2010. Nelly performed live for the November 13th Margarito/Pacquiao bout at Cowboys Stadium, Arlington, Texas. He also performed on Coke Studio on April 25, 2013, with Egyptian singer Sherine.

Accolades 
Nelly won "Top Streaming Song" for "Just a Dream" at the 2011 Billboard Music Awards. At the 2011 MuchMusic Video Awards, Nelly was Nominated for "MuchMusic.com Most Watched Video" for "Just a Dream" but lost to Taio Cruz's "Dynamite". The song is also covered in the 2012 musical comedy Pitch Perfect by Anna Kendrick.

Music video 
Nelly shot the music video to "Just a Dream" on August 26, 2010, at Playa del Rey, Los Angeles. The director of the video is Sanji. Nelly goes sky high in a dramatic black-and-white video, sitting in his car while floating high above the ocean. Nelly looks down on his girl—Kat Graham—as she runs along the shore. He later he comes down to ground to take a trip to the club. While searching for his love, he mistakes a girl walking on the street—actress Bianca Siavoshy—for his girlfriend. His dream home, a wedding ring, and his car, items that had been floating above the beach, burst into flames, their ashes falling to the shore below.  There are several shots of one of Nelly's eyes shattering as if made of glass.

The car in the video is a custom-made Ford Mustang GT.

The house in the video is a dollhouse called The Emerson House, made by toymaker Brinca Dada.

It premiered on September 24, 2010. Shannon Brown of the Los Angeles Lakers makes a cameo appearance.

Track listing 
Digital download
 "Just a Dream" – 3:57

Credits and personnel 
The credits for "Just a Dream" are adapted from 5.0 album liner notes.

Recording information
 Recorded in Florida at The Hit Factory Studios and Playland Playhouse, Miami.

Personnel
 Nelly – vocals, songwriter
 James Scheffer (Jim Jonsin) – producer, songwriter, keyboards
 Richard Butler, Jr. (Rico Love) – producer, songwriter
 Frank Romano – guitar, songwriter
 Robert Marks – recording engineer, audio mixer
 Ryan Evans – recording engineer
 Jason Wilkie – recording assistant, mixing assistant
 Matt Huber – recording assistant, mixing assistant
 Thurston McCrea – recording assistant, additional engineering
 Chad Jolley – mixing assistant
 Brandon Jones – additional engineering

Charts and certifications

Weekly charts

Year-end charts

Certifications

Radio and release history

References 

2010 singles
Number-one singles in Poland
Nelly songs
Black-and-white music videos
Songs written by Rico Love
Song recordings produced by Jim Jonsin
Music videos directed by Sanji (director)
2010 songs
Contemporary R&B ballads
Songs written by Frank Romano
Universal Motown Records singles
Songs written by Jim Jonsin
Song recordings produced by Rico Love
Songs about marriage
Songs written by Nelly